Elsbeth Plehn (7 March 1922 – 13 December 2001) was a German operatic contralto and voice teacher.

Life and career 
Plehn studied school music and music education at the University of Königsberg. In Dresden, she took singing lessons with Herbert Winkler and Martin Flämig. She was successful as a concert and oratorium singer.

In 1959, she became a lecturer at the Hochschule für Musik Carl Maria von Weber and was appointed professor in 1975.

Among her students were the bass baritone Peter Olesch, the mezzo-soprano Annelott Damm, the soprano Carola Nossek, the voice teachers Christiane Junghanns and Christiane Bach-Röhr and the director .

Further reading 
 Prof. Elsbeth Plehn. In Eva Johne (ed.): Profile aus Dresden. Vol. 1. Johne, Dresden 1993, .

References

External links 
 Plehn Elsbeth on Operissimo concertissimo.

1922 births
2001 deaths
German contraltos